AS Témala Ouélisse is a New Caledonian football team playing at the top level. It is based in Témala.

References
 

Football clubs in New Caledonia